The Tel Dan Stele is a fragmentary stele containing a Canaanite inscription which dates to the 9th century BCE. It is notable for possibly being the most significant and perhaps the only extra-biblical archeological reference to the house of David.

The Tel Dan Stele was discovered in 1993 in Tel-Dan by Gila Cook, a member of an archaeological team led by Avraham Biran. Its pieces were used to construct an ancient stone wall that survived into modern times. The stele contains several lines of Aramaic, closely related to Hebrew and historically a common language among Jews. The surviving inscription details that an individual killed Jehoram of Israel, the son of Ahab and king of the house of David. These writings corroborate passages from the Bible, as the Second Book of Kings mentions that Jehoram, also Joram, is the son of an Israelite king, Ahab, by his Phoenician wife, Jezebel. Applying a Biblical viewpoint to the inscription, the likely candidate for having erected the stele is Hazael, an Aramean king (whose language would have thus been Aramaic) who is mentioned in the Second Book of Kings as having conquered the Land of Israel, though he was unable to take Jerusalem. The stele is currently on display at the Israel Museum, and is known as KAI 310.

Discovery and description
Fragment A of the stele was discovered in July 1993 by Gila Cook of Biran's team who was studying Tel Dan in northern Israel. Fragments B1 and B2 were found in June 1994. The stele was not excavated in its "primary context", but in its "secondary use".

The fragments were published by Biran and his colleague Joseph Naveh in 1993 and 1995.

Overview 
The Tel Dan stele consists of several fragments making up part of a triumphal inscription in Aramaic, left most probably by Hazael of Aram-Damascus, an important regional figure in the late 9th century BCE. The unnamed king boasts of his victories over the king of Israel and his apparent ally the king of the "House of David" (b y t d w d). It is considered the earliest widely accepted reference to the name David as the founder of a Judahite polity outside of the Hebrew Bible, though the earlier Mesha Stele contains several possible references with varying acceptance. A minority of scholars have disputed the reference to David, due to the lack of a word divider between byt and dwd, and other translations have been proposed.  The Tel Dan stele is one of four known inscriptions made during a roughly 400-year period (1200-800 BCE) containing the name "Israel", the others being the Merneptah Stele, the Mesha Stele, and the Kurkh Monolith.

The Tel Dan inscription generated considerable debate and a flurry of articles, debating its age, authorship, and authenticity; however, the stele is generally accepted by scholars as genuine and a reference to the House of David.

Text

The following is the transcription using Hebrew letters provided by Biran and Naveh. Dots separate words (as in the original), empty square brackets indicate damaged/missing text, and text inside square brackets is reconstructed by Biran and Naveh: 

Romanized:

 
 
 
 
 
 
 
 
 
 
 
 
 

The 1995 translation by Biran reads;

 [       ]...[...] and cut [...]
 [...] my father went up  him when  fought at [...]
 and my father lay down, he went to his [ancestors (viz. became sick and died)]. And the king of 
 rael entered previously in my father's land, [and] Hadad made me king,
 And Hadad went in front of me, [and] I departed from the seven [...-]
 s of my kingdom, and I slew , who harnessed 
 riots and thousands of horsemen (or: horses). 
 king of Israel, and [I] killed 
 g of the House of David, and I set  towns into ruins and turned   ]
 their land into                               ]
 other [...                                                                    and Jehu 
 siege upon [                                                                                ]

Other scholars have presented alternate translations. For example, Andre Lemaire's 1998 translation reads;

 [.....]..[.............] and cut [..............]
 [.....] my father went up 
 And my father lay down, he went to his [fathers]. And the kings of 
 rael penetrated into my father's  Hadad made me - myself - king
 And Hadad went in front of  I departed from  .... [....]
 of my kings. And I killed two  who harnessed two 
 riots and two thousand horsemen. 
 king of Israel, and I killed 
 of the House of David. And I set [......]
 their land [.......]
 other ...[............ and Jehu 
 led over  ............]
 siege upon [.......]

The main differences are on line 6 and 7; Lemaire suggests that two kings, rather than seventy, were killed and that they possessed two thousand chariots and horsemen.

Content
In the second half of the 9th century BCE (the most widely accepted date for the stele), the kingdom of Aram, under its ruler Hazael, was a major power in the Levant. Dan, just 70 miles from Hazael's capital of Damascus, would almost certainly have come under its sway. This is borne out by the archaeological evidence: Israelite remains do not appear until the 8th century BCE, and it appears that Dan was already in the orbit of Damascus even before Hazael became king in c. 843 BCE.

The author of the inscription mentions conflict with the kings of Israel and the 'House of David'. The names of the two enemy kings are only partially legible. Biran and Naveh reconstructed them as Joram, son of Ahab, King of Israel, and Ahaziah, son of Joram of the House of David. Scholars seem to be evenly divided on these identifications. It is dependent on a particular arrangement of the fragments, and not all scholars agree on this.

In the reconstructed text, the author tells how Israel had invaded his country in his father's day, and how the god Hadad then made him king and marched with him against Israel. The author then reports that he defeated seventy kings with thousands of chariots and horses (more on this below). In the very last line there is a suggestion of a siege, possibly of Samaria, the capital of the kings of Israel. This reading is, however, disputed.

Interpretation and disputes

Configuration
The stele was found in three fragments, called A, B1 and B2. There is widespread agreement that all three belong to the same inscription, and that B1 and B2 belong together. There is less agreement over the fit between A and the combined B1/B2: Biran and Naveh placed B1/B2 to the left of A (the photograph at the top of this article). A few scholars have disputed this, William Schniedewind proposing some minor adjustments to the same fit, Gershon Galil placing B above A rather than beside it, and George Athas fitting it well below.

Dating 
Archaeologists and epigraphers put the earliest possible date at about 870 BCE, whilst the latest possible date is "less clear", although according to Lawrence J. Mykytiuk it could "hardly have been much later than 750". However, some scholars (mainly associated with the Copenhagen school) – Niels Peter Lemche, Thomas L. Thompson, and F. H. Cryer – have proposed still later datings.

Cracks and inscription
Two biblical scholars, Cryer and Lemche, analyzed the cracks and chisel marks around the fragment and also the lettering towards the edges of the fragments. From this they concluded that the text was in fact a modern forgery. Most scholars have ignored or rejected these judgments because the artifacts were recovered during controlled excavations.

Authorship
The language of the inscription is a dialect of Aramaic. Most scholars identify Hazael of Damascus (c. 842 – 806 BCE) as the author, although his name is not mentioned. Other proposals regarding the author have been made: George Athas has argued for Hazael's son Ben-Hadad III, which would date the inscription to around 796 BCE, and Jan-Wim Wesselius has argued for Jehu of Israel.

"Seventy kings"
While the original translators proposed that line 6 of the inscription refers to the slaying of "seventy kings", later epigraphers have offered alternative readings. Nadav Na'aman proposed that the line should be read as Hazael slew "mighty kings". According to Lemaire, "the reading 'seventy' is based only on a very small fragment of a letter which is interpreted as part of an 'ayin but could also be part of another letter". He proposed that the inscription should instead grammatically be read as "two kings" were slain, in line with the subsequent description of the inscription of only having defeated two kings. Other scholars have followed and further developed Lemaire's reading.

Matthew Suriano has defended the "seventy" reading, arguing that it is a symbolic trope in ancient near eastern military language, representing the defeat of all other claimants to power. Noting that Hazael was himself a usurper to the throne of Aram-Damascus, he argues that ancient Syria would have posited a number of other rivals for the throne and that Hazael's claim to have slain "seventy kings" is a reference to him defeating his rivals in succession to the throne of Aram-Damascus.

"House of David"

	
Since 1993–1994, when the first fragment was discovered and published, the Tel Dan stele has been the object of great interest and debate among epigraphers and biblical scholars. Its significance for the biblical version of Israel's past lies particularly in lines 8 and 9, which mention a "king of Israel" and possibly a "house of David". The latter reading is accepted by a majority of scholars but not all.

Dissenting scholars note that word dividers are employed elsewhere throughout the inscription and one would expect to find one between byt and dwd in bytdwd too if the intended reading was "House of David". They contend that reading dwd as "David" is complicated since the word can also mean "uncle" (dōd) (a word with a rather wider meaning in ancient times than it has today), "beloved", or "kettle" (dūd). Lemche and Athas suggests that bytdwd could be a place-name and Athas that it refers to Jerusalem (so that the author might be claiming to have killed the son of the king of Jerusalem, rather than the son of the king from the "house of David"). R.G. Lehmann and M. Reichel proposes interpreting the phrase as a reference to the name or epithet of a deity.

According to Anson Rainey the presence or absence of word dividers is normally inconsequential for interpretation. Word dividers as well as compound words are used elsewhere in the inscription and generally in West Semitic languages, so it is possible that the phrase was treated as a compound word combining a personal name with a relational noun. Mykytiuk argues that readings other than "House of David" are unlikely. Yosef Garfinkel has been vocally critical of alternate translations, characterizing them as "suggestions that now seem ridiculous: The Hebrew bytdwd should be read not as the House of David, but as a place named betdwd, in parallel to the well-known place-name Ashdod. Other minimalist suggestions included House of Uncle, House of Kettle and House of Beloved."

Francesca Stavrakopoulou states that even if the inscription refers to a "House of David" it testifies neither to the historicity of David nor to the existence of a 9th-century BCE Judahite kingdom. Garfinkel argues that, combined with archaeological evidence unearthed at Khirbet Qeiyafa, the inscription's reference to a "king of the house of David" constitutes primary evidence that David was a historical figure and the founder of a centralized Iron Age II dynasty.

See also

Historicity of David
List of artifacts significant to the Bible

References

Sources

Athas, George, "Setting the Record Straight: What Are We Making of the Tel Dan Inscription?” Journal of Semitic Studies 51 (2006): 241–256.

 

Finkelstein, Israel. "State Formation in Israel and Judah: A Contrast in Context, a Contrast in Trajectory" Near Eastern Archaeology, Vol. 62, No. 1 (Mar. 1999), pp. 35–52.

 

Schniedewind, William M. and Bruce Zuckerman, "A Possible Reconstruction of the Name of Hazael's Father in the Tel Dan Inscription," Israel Exploration Journal 51 (2001): 88–91.
Schniedewind, William M., "Tel Dan Stela: New Light on Aramaic and Jehu's Revolt." Bulletin of the American Schools of Oriental Research 302 (1996): 75–90.

Suriano, Matthew J., "The Apology of Hazael: A Literary and Historical Analysis of the Tel Dan Inscription", Journal of Near Eastern Studies 66/3 (2007): 163–76.
 
 
 

9th-century BC steles
8th-century BC steles
1993 archaeological discoveries
Ancient Near East steles
Aramaic inscriptions
KAI inscriptions
Archaeology of Israel
Land of Israel
Victory steles
Collections of the Israel Museum
Davidic line
Tribe of Dan
Biblical archaeology